The Sladen Suit was a heavy type of British divers' drysuit made by Siebe Gorman. It is entered by a wide rubber tube at the umbilicus: this tube is folded and tied off before the diver dives. It was used by British manned torpedo riders and for general underwater work.

It was sometimes nicknamed "Clammy Death".

The first model had two small glazed viewports. It was redesigned with the single oval flip-up viewport so the wearer could get binoculars to his eyes.

"Universal" rebreather
There was an oxygen rebreather called the "Universal" that was designed to be used with it. The Universal was a long-dive derivative of the Davis Submerged Escape Apparatus.

In popular culture 
 Brian Evenson's collection of literary horror, Windeye, includes a story entitled, and about, "The Sladen Suit."

References

External links

description and images

Rebreathers
Diving environmental protection equipment